Agum III was a Kassite king of Babylon ca. mid-15th century BC. Speculatively, he might figure around the 13th position in the dynastic sequence; however, this part of the Kingslist A has a lacuna, shared with the Assyrian Synchronistic Kinglist.

Agum (usually called Agum III), son of Kaštiliyåš, appears to have been one of the successors to Burna-Buriyåš I, because he is mentioned in the Chronicle of Early Kings after Ulam-Buriyåš, who was a son of a Burna-Buriyåš. Although this source does not give him a royal title, it is inconsistent in this regard and does say he called up his own army, ummānšu idkēma.

Campaigns Against the Sealand and in Dilmun

Little is known about the king, with the only Babylonian reference to him from an expedition he led against "the Sealand", a region synonymous with Sumer, ca. 1465 BC, which is described in the Chronicle of Early Kings. His invasion followed that of his uncle, Ulam-Buriyåš, described in the preceding lines of the chronicle, who had previously made himself “master of the land”, i.e. Sealand. Whether the campaign was against a competing Kassite kingdom, a restive province or a resurgent Sealand dynasty is not disclosed. He reputedly conquered the city of Dur-Enlil which is otherwise unknown and destroyed its temple of Egalgašešna, leaving him in control of all of southern Mesopotamia.

The excavation conducted by Béatrice André-Salvini (1995) in Bahrain, ancient Dilmun, yielded around 50 tablets some of which dated to Agum III, whose 3rd and 4th years are attested in the dates of texts found in the area of Qal’at al-Bahrain, when Kassite rule may have extended to the island. It has been suggested that following on from his successes conquering the Sealand, he crossed over to Bahrain, constructed a new palace and installed a local bureaucracy and by his 3rd and 4th years administrative documents began being dated to his reign. A problem arises with this theory due to the date formula. The later kings Kadašman-Ḫarbe I and Kurigalzu I each have texts dated using the archaic “year name” style and it is not until their successors, Kadašman-Enlil I and Burna-Buriaš II that regnal years count from the accession of a king.

Inscriptions

Notes

References

15th-century BC Babylonian kings
Kassite kings